The 1989 New South Wales Open was a tennis tournament played on outdoor hard courts at the NSW Tennis Centre in Sydney in Australia that was part of the 1989 Nabisco Grand Prix and of Tier IV of the 1989 WTA Tour. It was the 97th edition of the tournament (the 21st in the Open Era) and was held from 9 through 15 January 1989.

Finals

Men's singles

 Aaron Krickstein defeated  Andrei Cherkasov 6–4, 6–2
 It was Krickstein's 1st title of the year and the 5th of his career.

Women's singles

 Martina Navratilova defeated  Catarina Lindqvist 6–2, 6–4
 It was Navrátilová's 1st title of the year and the 282nd of her career.

Men's doubles

 Darren Cahill /  Wally Masur defeated  Pieter Aldrich /  Danie Visser 6–4, 6–3
 It was Cahill's 1st title of the year and the 8th of his career. It was Masur's 1st title of the year and the 11th of his career.

Women's doubles

 Martina Navratilova /  Pam Shriver defeated  Elizabeth Smylie /  Wendy Turnbull 6–3, 6–3
 It was Navratilova's 2nd title of the year and the 283rd of her career. It was Shriver's 1st title of the year and the 117th of her career.

External links
 Official website
 ATP tournament profile
 WTA tournament profile